The Lady Lever Art Gallery is a museum founded and built by the industrialist and philanthropist William Lever, 1st Viscount Leverhulme and opened in 1922. The Lady Lever Art Gallery is set in the garden village of Port Sunlight, on the Wirral and one of the National Museums Liverpool.

The museum is a significant surviving example of late Victorian and Edwardian taste. It houses major collections of fine and decorative art that are an expression of Lord Leverhulme's personal taste and collecting interests. The collection is strong in British 19th-century painting and sculpture, spilling over to include late 18th-century and early 20th works. There are important collections of English furniture, Wedgwood, especially jasperware, and Chinese ceramics, and smaller groups of other types of objects, such as Ancient Greek vases and Roman sculpture. The majority of objects were part of the original donation, but the collection has continued to expand at a modest rate. The museum displays mostly mixed paintings, sculpture and furniture together, and there are five period rooms recreating typical period interiors from large houses.

History
Lever began collecting art in the late 19th century, largely to use in advertising for the popular Sunlight Soap brand (manufactured a few minutes' walk from the gallery) that helped to create his fortune.  As he grew richer his collections began to expand, his confidence grew as well and he developed a taste for collecting. He mostly collected British art, but he was also fascinated by Chinese art, Roman sculpture and Greek vases, which he had chosen to collect to show styles that had influenced British artists in the eighteenth and the nineteenth centuries.

He endowed the gallery to showcase his collection. It is named in memory of his wife Elizabeth Hulme (Lady Lever) who had died in 1913.

The building
Commissioned in 1913 from architects William and Segar Owen, the Lady Lever Art Gallery was built in the Beaux-Arts style.  The building was opened in 1922 by Princess Beatrice, the youngest daughter of Queen Victoria.

In 2015 a touring exhibition visited museums in Japan and elsewhere. The redeveloped South End galleries were restored to their original architecture style as part of a £2.8 million restoration project in 2016. The work included opening up original doorways to increase the circulation of visitors, improving the lighting and restoring some of the original vaulted ceilings.

Collection
The Gallery has good representation of several trends in Victorian painting, including the Pre-Raphaelites, both during the period of the Brotherhood and in their subsequent careers. Concern with social conditions, classical revivalism and later historical painting are all represented. There are important works by Millais, Ford Madox Brown, William Holman Hunt, Dante Gabriel Rossetti, Edward Burne-Jones, Lord Leighton, and many others.  The museum has what appears to be the largest display in any museum of paintings by William Etty.  Earlier works include those by Turner, Constable, Gainsborough and Reynolds.

Much of the Wedgwood collection was from the collection of Dudley Marjoribanks, 1st Baron Tweedmouth, bought in 1905. This in turn was partly formed from the collection of Charles Darwin, Josiah Wedgwood's grandson.  It is probably the best collection of jasperware in the world.

The collection includes several examples of New Sculpture including works by Edward Onslow Ford, John Gibson, William Goscombe John, and F. W. Pomeroy.

Gallery of works of art in the collection

See also
 Listed buildings in Port Sunlight
 The Stuckists Punk Victorian
 Walker Art Gallery

References

External links

 Lady Lever Art Gallery official web site
 What's On at the Lady Lever Art Gallery
 A personal view with photographs
 

1922 establishments in England
Buildings and structures in the Metropolitan Borough of Wirral
National Museums Liverpool
Art museums and galleries in Merseyside
Biographical museums in Merseyside
Grade II listed buildings in Merseyside
Decorative arts museums in England
Museums in Merseyside
Art museums established in 1922